The fifth season of The Voice Kids of Vietnam- Giọng hát Việt nhí began on 12 August 2017 on VTV3. Vũ Cát Tường returned for her second season as a coach, while Noo Phước Thịnh, Đông Nhi and Ông Cao Thắng were replaced by singers Soobin Hoàng Sơn, Hương Tràm (The Voice season 1 winner), and Tiên Cookie, respectively.

This season was won by Dương Ngọc Ánh, an 11-year-old girl from Bắc Giang, mentored by Vũ Cát Tường, marking Vũ Cát Tường's first win as a coach after two seasons coaching on The Voice Kids.

Coaches and hosts
The coaching panel had three changes from season four. After joining the adult version earlier in 2017, it was speculated that both Noo Phước Thịnh and Đông Nhi would not be returning to The Voice Kids for the fifth season. Continue with the success from the judging panel in 2016, young and famous Vietnamese singers were rumoured to be joining the show, which included Soobin Hoàng Sơn, Vietnamese hitmaker Sơn Tùng M-TP, The X Factor Vietnam winner Giang Hồng Ngọc, Tiên Tiên, Minh Hằng and The Voice season 1 winner Hương Tràm. On May 28, 2017, in an interview, Soobin Hoàng Sơn accidentally revealed that he would become a coach for The Voice Kids season 5, which he later confirmed the news. Bảo Thy, The Remix 2017 winner, revealed that she was approached by Cat Tien Sa, but she turned the chance down, saying it "was not the right time". Vũ Cát Tường, a favored coach from season 4, announced her return to the show on June 11. A poster was posted on the Facebook fanpage of the show shortly after the first two coaches were announced, with shadows of the other two yet-to-be-announced coaches were blacked out. The poster arose rumors that Hương Tràm and musician Tiên Cookie would be new coaches. On June 26, 2017, the double chair was indeed revealed to be composed of Hương Tràm and Tiên Cookie. Different from the history of the show's double chair, which is usually composed of duos or couples, this is the first time that Hương Tràm and Tiên Cookie collaborate with each other.

Along with departures of Noo Phước Thịnh, Đông Nhi and Ông Cao Thắng, it was also implied that host Ngô Kiến Huy, who is also a member of the group, would not be returning to the show. Thành Trung, a popular TV presenter of Vietnamese television nowadays, was revealed to become the show's new host in the filming day. Quỳnh Chi, former host of the adult version, joined him in the Battles and Liveshows.

Teams
Color key

Blind auditions 
Filming for the blind auditions began in late June 2017. The blind auditions consists of five episode, airing from August 12 to September 5, 2017. Each coach has the length of the contestant's performance to choose them for their team. If more than two coaches want the same contestant, the contestant will choose which team they want to join. The blind auditions end when all teams are full.

Episode 1 (12 August)

Episode 2 (19 August)

Episode 3 (26 August)

Episode 4 (2 September)

Episode 5 (16 September) 

1 Hương Tràm & Tiên Cookie, Vũ Cát Tường all turned for Đỗ Thị Hoài Ngọc in spite of their teams were full. She was still joined team Soobin by default.

The Battles
The Battle Round follows the same rule as previous seasons, with 5 battles from each team. However, in a new twist, a coach may save one contestant from another team to join his/her team for the Playoffs rather than from his/her own team, thus marking the first time in the history of The Voice Kids to adapt the "Steals" from the adult version. However, the "Steals" would be recorded off-stage. After this round ends, each team would have 6 contestants.

The advisors for each team in the Battles are: Hoàng Bách for team Soobin, Thùy Chi for team Tràm Tiên and Hà Anh Tuấn for team Vũ Cát Tường.

Colour key

Playoffs
In this season of The Voice Kids, all the playoff rounds is pre-recorded while only the finals show is recorded live, following the new regulation applied in the fourth season of The Voice of Vietnam. The "Wildcard" twist is also returned, bringing back one contestant who was eliminated before the finals back to the show's live finale. The audience will vote for contestants through the vote portal on the website SaoStar.vn. However, in a new twist, this year each team would receive a Wildcard, meaning that there would be 3 contestants brought back to the finals, thus a 6-contestant finale.

Color key:

Week 1 and 2 (October 14 & 21, 2017)
The first 9 contestants of the 3 teams performed together at Liveshow 1. During the night, each team had 3 contestants. Results were not announced. The following 9 contestants of all three teams performed together on Liveshow 2. On that night, each team had three contestants. The results of the contestants were announced at the end of Liveshow 2 in the following manner:
 The top two contestants received the highest public vote were automatically sent through the next round.
 Three contestants selected by their coach were qualified for the next round.
 The remaining contestant was eliminated.

Week 3 (October 28, 2017)
All 15 contestants from 3 teams performed at this round. Results are based on the same method as the last round, with four contestants from each team advanced to the next round, two chosen by the public and two selected by their coaches. The remaining contestant was eliminated.

Week 4 (November 4, 2017)

Week 5: Quarterfinals (November 11, 2017)
This week, for the first time in the show's history, all teams had to set up a minishow based on a specific theme. Each team's minishow consisted of 3 solo performances from each team members, and concluded with a group performance with their coaches. One contestant with the most public vote was sent through to the semifinals, one then saved by the coaches, and the other contestant was eliminated.

Week 6: Semifinals (November 18, 2017)
At the Semifinals this season, each contestant performed a solo song and a song with his/ her teammate and a guest performer. The contestant earned more total score based on 50% of the audience vote and 50% of the coach advanced to the finals. The other one was automatically eliminated.

On Sunday, November 19, 2017, the three Wildcards were announced via the show's Facebook fanpage as: Trần Thị Hồng Thư for team Hương Tràm & Tiên Cookie, Đặng Đình Tâm for team Vũ Cát Tường and Trần Quốc Thái for team Soobin Hoàng Sơn.

Week 7: Finals (November 25, 2017)
The finals were broadcast live with the final 6's performances.

 Final Result
After all teams' group performances were concluded, the voting window was officially closed. The Top 6 then took the stage to perform one final song, "Lời Cảm Ơn (Thank You)". The three finalists with the lowest votes were announced afterward as Trần Thị Hồng Thư, Trần Quốc Thái and Đặng Đình Tâm. They received the bronze prize, thus all finished in joint third places. This left the other three finalist as the official final 3. Presenter Thành Trung only announced the percentage vote of the winner only, and then crowned Dương Ngọc Ánh as the winner, after scoring 39,38% of the public votes. Đỗ Thị Hoài Ngọc and Lê Châu Như Ngọc were both announced to be runners-up.

Elimination chart

Artist's info

Result details

Contestants who appeared on previous shows or seasons
 Nguyễn Duy Linh competed on season 4 of The Voice Kids and joined team Noo Phước Thịnh, but was eliminated at the Battles.
 Trần Thị Hồng Thư sang in the Blind auditions of the fourth season but didn't turn a chair.
 Vũ Nguyễn Minh Anh competed on season 1 of Junior MasterChef, where she placed 4th.
 Trần Quốc Thái won Đồ Rê Mí 2013 as a double prize, along with The Voice Kids season 4 winner Trịnh Nhật Minh. He also participated in Your Face Sounds Familiar: Kids in 2016.

References

1
2017 Vietnamese television seasons
2010s Vietnamese television series